Babafemi Adeyemi Osofisan (born June 16, 1946), known as Femi Osofisan or F.O., is a Nigerian writer noted for his critique of societal problems and his use of African traditional performances and surrealism in some of his plays. 
A frequent theme that his drama explore is the conflict between good and evil. He is a didactic writer whose works seek to correct his decadent society. He has written poetry under the pseudonym Okinba Launko.

Education and career
Babafemi Adeyemi Osofisan was born in the village of Erunwon, Ogun State, Nigeria, on June 16, 1946, to Ebenezer Olatokunbo Osofisan, a school teacher, lay reader and church organist, and Phoebe Olufunke Osofisan, a schoolteacher. His last name, Ọ̀sọ́fisan, signifies that his paternal ancestors were artists and artisans who worshipped the god of beauty and ornaments, Ọ̀ṣọ́. Osofisan attended primary school at Ife and secondary school at Government College, Ibadan. 
He then attended the University of Ibadan (1966–69), majoring in French and as part of his degree course studying at the University of Dakar for a year, and going on to do post-graduate studies at the Sorbonne, Paris. He subsequently held faculty positions at the University of Ibadan, where he retired as full professor in 2011. He is currently a Distinguished Professor of Theatre Arts, Kwara State University, Nigeria.

Osofisan is Vice President (West Africa) of the Pan African Writers' Association.

In 2016, he became the first African to be awarded the prestigious Thalia Prize by the International Association of Theatre Critics, the induction ceremony taking place on 27 September.

Writing 

Osofisan has written and produced more than 60 plays. He has also written four prose works: Ma'ami, Abigail, Pirates of Hurt and Cordelia, first produced in newspaper columns, in The Daily Times and then The Guardian. One of his prose works; Ma'ami was adapted into a film in 2011.
Several of Osofisan's plays are adaptations of works by other writers: Women of Owu from Euripides' The Trojan Women; Who's Afraid of Solarin? from Nikolai Gogol's The Government Inspector; No More the Wasted Breed from Wole Soyinka's The Strong Breed; Another Raft from J. P. Clark's The Raft; Tegonni: An African Antigone from Sophocles′ Antigone, and others.

Osofisan in his works also emphasizes gender: his representation of women as objects, objects of social division, due to shifting customs and long-lived traditions, and also as instruments for sexual exploitation; and his portrayal of women as subjects, individuals capable of cognition, endowed with consciousness and will, and capable of making decisions and effecting actions.

Selected works
Kolera Kolej. New Horn, 1975.
The Chattering and the Song. Ibadan: Ibadan University Press, 1977.
Morountodun and Other Plays. Lagos: Longman, 1982.
Minted Coins (poetry), Heinemann, 1987.
Another Raft. Lagos: Malthouse, 1988.
Once upon Four Robbers. Ibadan: Heinemann, 1991
Twingle-Twangle A-Twynning Tayle. Longman, 1992.
Yungba-Yungba and the Dance Contest: A Parable for Our Times, Heinemann Educational, Nigeria, 1993.
The Album of the Midnight Blackout, University Press, Nigeria, 1994.
"Warriors of a Failed Utopia?  West African writers since the 70s" in Leeds African Studies Bulletin 61 (1996), pp. 11–36.
Tegonni: An African Antigone. Ibadan: Opon Ifa, 1999.
"Theater and the Rites of 'Post-Negritude' Remembering". Research in African Literatures 30.1 (1999): 1–11.
 "Love's Unlike Lading: A Comedy from Shakespeare". Lagos: Concept Publications. 2012
 "One Legend, Many seasons". Lagos: Concept Publications. 2001

Awards
 2015: PAWA Membership Honorary Award
 2016: Thalia Prize from the International Association of Theatre Critics

References

Contemporary Authors Online, Thomson Gale.

Further reading
 Sola Adeyemi, Vision of Change in African Drama: Femi Osofisan's Dialectical Reading of History and Politics, Cambridge Scholars Publishing, 2019 
 Adeoti, Gbemisola. "The loudness of the “Unsaid”: Proverbs in selected African drama." Legon Journal of the Humanities 30, no. 1 (2019): 82-104.Web link
 Chima Osakwe, The Revolutionary Drama and Theatre of Femi Osofisan. Cambridge Scholars Publishing, 2018 
Olakunbi Olasope (ed), Black Dionysos: Conversations with Femi Osofisan. Ibadan: Kraft Books. 2013 
Osisanwo, Ayo & Muideen Adekunle. Expressions of Political Consciousness in Wole Soyinka’s Alapata Apata and Femi Osofisan's Morountodun: A Pragma-Stylistic Analysis. Ibadan Journal of English Studies 7 (2018): 521–542.
 Sola Adeyemi (ed), Portraits for an Eagle: Essays in Honour of Femi Osofisan, Bayreuth African Studies, 2006. 
 Tunde Akinyemi and Toyin Falola (eds), Emerging Perspectives on Femi Osofisan, Africa World Press, 2009.

External links
 Femi Osofisan's Word
Wumi Raji, "Africanizing Antigone: Postcolonial Discourse and Strategies of Indigenizing a Western Classic", Research in African Literatures, Volume 36, Number 4, Winter 2005, pp. 135–154 | 10.1353/ral.2005.0174.
 Adesola Adeyemi, "Femi Osofisan: A Chronology", African Postcolonial Literature in English.
Martin Banham reviews Femi Osofisan's Major Plays 2 in the Leeds African Studies Bulletin 68 (2006). 
 Don Rubin, "A Brief Introduction to Femi Osofisan", Critical Stages/Scènes Critiques, December 2016: Issue No 14.

Nigerian writers
People from Ogun State
1946 births
Living people
Yoruba writers
Government College, Ibadan alumni
University of Ibadan alumni
20th-century Nigerian writers
English-language writers from Nigeria
Yoruba academics
Academic staff of the University of Ibadan
Academic staff of Kwara State University